Michael Bercovici (born February 9, 1993) is an American football coach and former quarterback who currently serves as an offensive assistant for the Arizona Cardinals. He played college football at Arizona State. He signed with the San Diego Chargers as an undrafted free agent after the 2016 NFL Draft and has also spent time with the Cardinals and San Diego Fleet.

High school career
Bercovici was born in Northridge, California. He attended Taft High School in Los Angeles. As a senior, he was 240-of-399 passes (60.2%) for 3,755 yards with 37 touchdowns and only nine interceptions in 2010, he also recorded 103 rushing yards with three touchdowns.

He was rated by PrepStar as the 91st overall prospect in the nation, and the seventh overall quarterback in the nation. He was also ranked the 14th overall pro-style quarterback in the nation by Rivals.com. He was offered an athletic scholarship to Arizona State University in June 2010, he accepted the scholarship a week later.

College career
As a true freshman in 2011, Bercovici appeared in three games. He completed 2-of-3 passes for 15 yards. In 2012, he redshirted the season. As a redshirt sophomore in 2013, he appeared in four games as holder on special teams. He completed 3-of-4 (75%) for 18 yards and a quarterback rating of 112.8. He also rushed the ball 10 times for 46 yards. As a redshirt junior in 2014, he appeared in eight games (three starts). He replaced starter Taylor Kelly after Kelly was injured. Becovici complete 115-of-186 (61.8%) for 1,445 yards and 12 touchdowns and four interceptions. He also rushed the ball 26 times for 16 yards. As a redshirt senior in 2015, he was named the starting quarterback. He was a unanimous team captain and member of the team's leadership council. He started all 13 games. He completed 318-of-531 (59-.9%) for 3,854 yards, 30 touchdowns and nine interceptions. He also rushed the ball 109 times for 84 yards. His 30 touchdowns tied the Arizona State school record for most touchdown passes in a single season. His 531 passing attempts set the record for most passing attempts in a single season in school history.

On October 4, 2014 Bercovici threw a 46-yard Hail Mary with time expiring to beat USC in the Los Angeles Memorial Coliseum 38–34. Bercovici ended the game with a record-setting performance, throwing for 510 yards and 5 touchdowns – the most ever thrown by a USC opponent.

Bercovici graduated from Arizona State with a Bachelor of Science degree in Business management in 2014 and a Master's Degree in Sports law and Business in 2015.

College statistics

Professional career

San Diego / Los Angeles Chargers
After going undrafted in the 2016 NFL Draft, Bercovici was signed by the San Diego Chargers. 
He was eventually featured on the NFL Network show Undrafted. On September 3, 2016, he was released by the Chargers during the final roster cuts. He signed a reserve/future contract with the Chargers on January 10, 2017. He was waived on September 2, 2017.

Arizona Cardinals
On October 24, 2017, Bercovici was signed to the Arizona Cardinals' practice squad. On November 30, 2017, he was released by the Cardinals.

San Diego Fleet
In 2018, Bercovici signed with the Arizona Hotshots of the newly-formed Alliance of American Football, but was later drafted by the San Diego Fleet with their second-round pick in the league's quarterback draft in November.

Bercovici began the 2019 AAF season as the Fleet's starting quarterback. In the opener against the San Antonio Commanders, he was hit by Shaan Washington in an impact that knocked his helmet off, but continued to play. Bercovici struggled in the 15–6 loss as he was sacked six times and threw two interceptions before being replaced by Philip Nelson. League offices credited Bercovici for being a sacrificial lamb for the league, as the hit provided viral buzz for the league on social media despite an otherwise mediocre on-field product.

Nelson was eventually announced as the starter for the following week's game against the Atlanta Legends. In early March, Bercovici returned to the starting role against the Salt Lake Stallions after Nelson suffered a clavicle fracture in the previous game and was placed on injured reserve; Bercovici completed 22 of 43 passes for 304 yards with a touchdown and interception, including a 45-yard throw to Dontez Ford on the final drive that set up Donny Hageman's game-winning field goal to clinch a 27–25 San Diego victory. The league ceased operations in April 2019.

Career statistics

Coaching career
In May 2019, Bercovici returned to Arizona State as a graduate assistant. ASU head coach Herm Edwards had approached Bercovici about the position in January, but he declined in order to play in the AAF.

Arizona Cardinals
In 2020, Bercovici joined the Arizona Cardinals' coaching staff as an entry-level assistant to head coach Kliff Kingsbury. On May 10, 2022, Bercovici was promoted to offensive assistant.

References

External links
 Arizona State Sun Devils bio
 

Living people
1993 births
American football quarterbacks
American people of Romanian-Jewish descent
Arizona Cardinals coaches
Arizona Cardinals players
Arizona Hotshots players
Arizona State Sun Devils football coaches
Arizona State Sun Devils football players
Jewish American sportspeople
Los Angeles Chargers players
People from Calabasas, California
People from Northridge, Los Angeles
Players of American football from Los Angeles
San Diego Chargers players
San Diego Fleet players
William Howard Taft Charter High School alumni
21st-century American Jews
Sports coaches from Los Angeles